Lochview and Pier Cottage is a pair of buildings in Luss, Argyll and Bute, Scotland. They are Category B listed, dating to the mid 19th century.

The buildings, single-storey cottages located on Pier Road, are made of whinstone and sandstone rubble with pink sandstone margins and dressings. The cottage to the left has a central door with flanking windows, while that on the right has a single window to the left of the door. Both possess timber diamond-paned casement windows. Each cottage has a pair of octagonal chimney stacks with octagonal cans.

Pier Cottage is sometimes referred to as Pierview Cottage.

See also
List of listed buildings in Luss, Argyll and Bute

References

External links
Luss, Pierview Cottage – Canmore
View of the building – Google Street View, April 2011

19th-century establishments in Scotland
Listed buildings in Luss, Argyll and Bute
Category B listed buildings in Argyll and Bute